The World of Alfred Hitchcock  is a 1976 Danish television documentary about the English film director Alfred Hitchcock directed by Annett Wolf. Shot after the completion of Family Plot, it was part of a series of films she made in Hollywood during the one-year leave of absence she took from DR (broadcaster)

Synopsis
In the setting of his office at Universal Studios, Alfred Hitchcock shares his vision of what an artistic film should be in the framework of a commercial industry, the difference between suspense films and mystery films, his conception of eroticism and his vision of Scandinavian women. He also explains in details how he created the suspense in the famous sequence of North by Northwest in the corn field. The film contains an original interview with Bruce Dern, who describes Hitchcock's method as a director, and film clips from North by Northwest, Frenzy, Topaz, and Family Plot.

See also
 1976 in film
 Cinema of Denmark

External links
 

1976 films
1976 documentary films

Danish documentary films
1970s English-language films